Mahmud Muhtar Pasha (1867 – 15 March 1935), known as Mahmut Muhtar Katırcıoğlu since 1934, was an Ottoman-born Turkish military officer and diplomat, the son of the Grand Vizier Ahmed Muhtar Pasha.

Biography 

He was born in Constantinople and returned to the city in 1893 after seven years' military education in Germany. He was a participant in the Greco-Turkish War of 1897, in spite of the prohibition by the Sultan. In 1910, he became Minister of Navy in Ibrahim Hakkı Pasha's cabinet and arranged the construction of the first Turkish dreadnought. He married Princess Nimetullah Khanum Effendi, a daughter of Isma'il Pasha and they had five children.

At the outbreak of the First Balkan War in 1912, he went to the front, commanded the III Corps in the Battle of Kirk Kilisse , Battle of Lule Burgas and was severely wounded in the First Battle of Çatalca He wrote an account of his experiences in the Balkan War titled Why We Lost Rumelia, of which German and French versions appeared in 1913.

On 30 May 1929, Mahmud Muhtar Pasha was put on trial before the Supreme Court (formerly , today ) on charges of damnifying the state treasury by remitting 20,000 pounds without security to the British Thames Ironworks and Shipbuilding Company in conjunction with works for the Anatolian Railway Company. On 3 November 1929, he was sentenced to making a payment of 22,000 Turkish gold coins discounted by five percent.

See also
 List of Turkish diplomats

Sources 

1867 births
1935 deaths
Ottoman Military Academy alumni
Ottoman Military College alumni
Ottoman Army generals
Pashas
Ottoman military personnel of the Greco-Turkish War (1897)
Ottoman military personnel of the Italo-Turkish War
Ottoman military personnel of the Balkan Wars
Government ministers of the Ottoman Empire
Diplomats of the Ottoman Empire
Ottoman governors of Aidin
Turkish politicians convicted of crimes